Adrian Duminicel (born 30 September 1980) is a Romanian bobsledder. He competed at the 2002 Winter Olympics and the 2006 Winter Olympics.

References

1980 births
Living people
Romanian male bobsledders
Olympic bobsledders of Romania
Bobsledders at the 2002 Winter Olympics
Bobsledders at the 2006 Winter Olympics
Sportspeople from Bucharest